Carpocyon is an extinct genus of the Borophaginae subfamily of canids native to North America. The four species in the genus varied in size, with the largest (C. webbi) being about the size of a wolf; all had relatively small teeth, suggesting a diet that was more omnivorous than that of other contemporary borophagines.

Species
Carpocyon compressus (syn. Cynodesmus cuspidatus), fossils have been found in Nevada, Nebraska, Colorado, and Kansas. 
Carpocyon limosus, fossils have been found in Nebraska, Oklahoma, and Florida.
Carpocyon robustus, fossils have been found in Arizona, California, Colorado, South Dakota, and Texas.
Carpocyon webbi, fossils have been found in Nebraska and New Mexico.

References

zipcodezoo.com
The Biology and Conservation of Wild Canids By David W. Macdonald, and Claudio Sillero-Zubiri 
Flynn, J.J., 1998. Early Cenozoic Carnivora ("Miacoidea"). pp. 110–123 in C.M. Janis, K.M. Scott, and L.L. Jacobs (eds.) Evolution of Tertiary Mammals of North America. Volume 1: Terrestrial Carnivores, Ungulates, and Ungulatelike Mammals. Cambridge University Press, Cambridge. 

Borophagines
Miocene canids
Miocene mammals of North America
Prehistoric carnivoran genera